The 2006–07 season was the 103rd season of competitive football in Turkey.

Events
4 August 2006 – First match of the season is played between Galatasaray S.K. and Büyükşehir Belediye Ankaraspor. The match resulted in a 1–1 draw.
5 August 2006 — Fenerbahçe S.K. begin their centenary year off with a 6–0 win over Kayseri Erciyesspor.
14 April 2007 – Lüleburgazspor and Belediye are promoted to the Turkish Third League. Oyak Renault and Cizrespor are relegated to the Turkish Third League. Karamanspor, Iğdırspor, and Sidespor are relegated to the Turkish Regional Amateur League.
19 April 2007 — Yalovaspor and Darica Gençlerbirliği are relegated to the Turkish Third League. DÇ Divriğispor requested to take the season off after their bus was involved in an accident for the second time this season. The bus turned over, injuring twenty players and staff. The Turkish Football Federation accepted the request. There will only be one club relegated from Group 2 (Iğdırspor) and DÇ Divriğispor will return next season playing in the Turkish Third League.
21 April 2007 – Diyarbakır BB DİSKİ, Bozüyükspor, Afyonkarahisarspor, and Gaziosmanpaşa are promoted to the Iddaa League B.
28 April 2007 — Göztepe are relegated to the Izmir Amateur League. Çorluspor are relegated to the Tekirdağ Amateur League. Bakırköy are relegated to the Istanbul Amateur League.
29 April 2007 — Sakaryaspor are relegated to the Türk Telekom League A.
1 May 2007 — Adanaspor, BUGSAŞ, and Tepecik Belediye are promoted to the Iddaa League B. Mersin B.B., Aksarayspor, Bulancakspor, Değirmenderespor, Aliağa Belediye, Merinos, Alibeyköy, and Gölcükspor qualify for the promotion play-offs. Osmaniyespor are relegated to the Osmaniye Amateur League.
13 May 2007 — Fenerbahçe S.K. become champion after a 2–2 draw with Trabzonspor, while second place Beşiktaş J.K. lost 0–3 to Bursaspor.

Managerial changes

National team
Turkey began their qualifying campaign for Euro 2008 on 6 September, beating Malta 2–0.

Key
 H = Home match
 A = Away match
 F = Friendly
 ECQ = European Championship qualifier

Honours

Club honours

Player honours
Player of the Year
 Alex
Youth Player of the Year
 Arda Turan

Team of the Year

Top scorer

Transfer deals

Retirements
30 December 2006 – Mirosław Szymkowiak (Trabzonspor)

References

 
Seasons in Turkish football
Turkish 2006